Berta Rahm (October 4, 1910 in St. Gallen; October 10, 1998 in Neunkirch) was a Swiss architect, writer, publisher, and feminist activist.

Life and career

With some influence from her uncle Arnold Meyer, who owned a successful firm in Hallau, Rahm studied architecture at the ETH Zürich (Eidgenossische Technische Hochschule, the Swiss Federal Institute of Technology in Zurich) from 1929 to 1934. After graduating she traveled through Scandinavia and the Netherlands with grant funding from ETH. Following her travels, she worked in Hallau, Flims and Zürich, until she started her own firm in 1940. Rahm was strongly influenced by Scandinavian architecture and built various vacation houses, single-family residences and exhibition pavilions, most notably the 1959 pavilion for SAFFA, in the Scandinavian style. The relative social and personal freedom allowed women in Scandinavia also formed a lasting impression on Rahm. In 1942 she put together a book on the subject illustrated with her own drawings. 

Her position as a woman made it difficult for Rahm to secure building licenses and she was excluded from design competitions, especially for profitable public building projects, and she decided to close her firm and retire as an architect in 1966. Following the closure of her office, she founded a publishing firm, ALA-Verlag, specializing in feminist literature, which operated into the 1990s. ALA-Verlag published a series of women's biographies and reissued classic works of feminism by Mary Wollstonecraft, Flora Tristan and Hedwig Dohm. For each book published under her tenure, she wrote an instructional fore- and afterword.

Rahm was a member of the Schweizerischen Ingenieur- und Architektenvereins (Swiss Engineers and Architects Union), the Union internationale des femmes architectes (UIFA), and the Bund Schweizerischer Frauenorganisationen (Federation of Swiss Women's Associations).

Projects
 Nägeliseehof farm, Hallau, 1951
 Hohweri House, Hallau, 1953–54
 SAFFA exhibition pavilion, Zurich, 1958

Bibliography
 Rahm, Berta. 1939: Reise Nach Skandinavien Und Finnland. Büchergilde Gutenberg, 1942.
 Rahm, Berta. Vom Möblierten Zimmer Bis Zur Wohnung: Anregungen Für Das Einrichten Von Einzelräumen Und Wohnungen. Schweizer Spiegel Verl, 1947.
 Rahm, Berta, and Marie Goegg. Marie Goegg (Geb. Pouchoulin) : Mitbegründerin Der Internationalen Liga Für Frieden Und Freiheit : Gründerin Des Internationalen Frauenbundes, Des Journal Des Femmes Und Der Solidarité. ALA-Verlag, 1993.

See also
 List of women architects
 The International Archive of Women in Architecture

References

External links
 
 

1910 births
1998 deaths
People from St. Gallen (city)
Swiss women architects
Swiss women writers
Swiss publishers (people)
Swiss feminists